David E. Johnson (born December 21, 1946 in Princeton, New Jersey) is an American linguist.  He is the co-inventor of arc pair grammar.

Work 
Johnson is best known for his work on relational grammar, especially the development with Paul Postal in 1977 of arc pair grammar.

In the late 1990s, Johnson and Shalom Lappin published the first detailed critiques of Noam Chomsky's Minimalist program. This work was followed by a lively debate with proponents of minimalism on the scientific status of the program

References

Sources
Johnson, David E. (1974/1979). Toward a Theory of Relationally-based Grammar. Outstanding Dissertations in Linguistics Series, ed. Jorge Hankamer.  NY: Garland Publishing, Inc.  
Newmeyer, Frederick (1980). Linguistics in America. New York: Academic Press. 

1946 births
Living people
Linguists from the United States
Syntacticians

bn:পল পোস্টাল